Fouad Yaha (born 19 August 1996) is a French professional rugby league footballer who plays as a er for the Catalans Dragons in the Super League and France at international level.

Yaha briefly played rugby union for SU Agen before returning to Catalans in 2019.

Background
Yaha was born in Avignon, Provence-Alpes-Côte d'Azur, France. He is of Moroccan descent.

Club career
Yaha made his Super League debut for Catalans Dragons in a 32–24 victory over Hull Kingston Rovers in 2015. At 18 years old, he became the youngest player at the time to have played for the Dragons in Super League.

Yaha was a member of the Catalans team that won the 2018 Challenge Cup Final with victory over the Warrington Wolves at Wembley Stadium.

In round 3 of the 2021 Super League season, he scored a hat-trick in Catalans 42–6 victory over Salford.
On 9 October 2021, Yaha played for Catalans in their 2021 Super League Grand Final defeat against St. Helens.
In round 22 of the 2022 Super League season, Yaha scored a hat-trick in Catalans 20-16 victory over Wakefield Trinity.
In round 25 of the 2022 Super League season, Yaha scored a hat-trick in Catalans 24-14 French Derby victory over Toulouse Olympique.  The result also meant Toulouse were relegated back to the Championship.

Rugby union
At the end of the 2018 Super League season, Yaha joined Top 14 rugby union club SU Agen, however he returned to rugby league with the Dragons in February 2019.

Personal life
Yaha is the nephew of former France international Bagdad Yaha, who played in the inaugural season of Super League for Paris Saint-Germain.

References

External links
Catalans Dragons profile
Catalans profile
France profile
SL profile
French profile
France RL profile

1996 births
Living people
Sportspeople from Avignon
Catalans Dragons players
France national rugby league team players
French sportspeople of Moroccan descent
French rugby league players
French rugby union players
Rugby league wingers
SU Agen Lot-et-Garonne players